The 2021 Spain Masters was a badminton tournament which was held at the Palacio de los Deportes Carolina Marín in Huelva, Spain, from 18 to 23 May 2021 with a total prize purse of $140,000.

Tournament 
The 2021 Spain Masters was the fourth tournament of the 2021 BWF World Tour and also part of the Spain Masters championships, which had been held since 2018. This tournament was organized by the Spanish Badminton Federation and sanctioned by the BWF.

Venue 
This international tournament was held at the Palacio de los Deportes Carolina Marín in Huelva, Spain.

Point distribution 
Below is the point distribution table for each phase of the tournament based on the BWF points system for the BWF World Tour Super 300 event.

Prize money 
The total prize money for this tournament was US$140,000. Distribution of prize money was in accordance with BWF regulations.

Men's singles

Seeds 

 Shesar Hiren Rhustavito (semi-finals)
 Toma Junior Popov (champion)
 Misha Zilberman (quarter-finals)
 Subhankar Dey (withdrew)
 Pablo Abián (second round)
 Ygor Coelho de Oliveira (quarter-finals)
 Ajay Jayaram (withdrew)
 Felix Burestedt (second round)

Finals

Top half

Section 1

Section 2

Bottom half

Section 3

Section 4

Women's singles

Seeds 

 Carolina Marín (withdrew)
 Line Kjærsfeldt (withdrew)
 Line Christophersen  (final)
 Lianne Tan (quarter-finals)
 Ruselli Hartawan (second round)
 Julie Dawall Jakobsen (second round)
 Sabrina Jaquet (withdrew)
 Kristin Kuuba (second round)

Finals

Top half

Section 1

Section 2

Bottom half

Section 3

Section 4

Men's doubles

Seeds 

 Kim Astrup / Anders Skaarup Rasmussen (quarter-finals)
 Leo Rolly Carnando / Daniel Marthin (quarter-finals)
 Muhammad Shohibul Fikri / Bagas Maulana (quarter-finals)
 Christo Popov / Toma Junior Popov (semi-finals)
 Pramudya Kusumawardana / Yeremia Rambitan (champions)
 Daniel Lundgaard / Mathias Thyrri (withdrew)
 Joel Eipe / Rasmus Kjær (withdrew)
 Ruben Jille / Ties van der Lecq (second round)

Finals

Top half

Section 1

Section 2

Bottom half

Section 3

Section 4

Women's doubles

Seeds 

 Amalie Magelund / Freja Ravn (final)
 Anastasiia Akchurina / Olga Morozova (withdrew)
 Kati-Kreet Marran / Helina Rüütel (second round)
 Julie Finne-Ipsen / Mai Surrow (quarter-finals)
 Anna Cheong / Yap Cheng Wen (quarter-finals)
 Nita Violina Marwah / Putri Syaikah (quarter-finals)
 Julie MacPherson / Ciara Torrance (semi-finals)
 Debora Jille /  Léa Palermo (second round)

Finals

Top half

Section 1

Section 2

Bottom half

Section 3

Section 4

Mixed doubles

Seeds 

 Rinov Rivaldy / Pitha Haningtyas Mentari (champions)
 Niclas Nøhr / Amalie Magelund (final)
 Evgenij Dremin / Evgenia Dimova (withdrew)
 Adam Hall / Julie MacPherson  (semi-finals)
 Fabien Delrue / Léa Palermo (second round)
 Eloi Adam / Margot Lambert (first round)
 Mathias Thyrri / Mai Surrow (withdrew)
 Dejan Ferdinansyah / Serena Kani (quarter-finals)

Finals

Top half

Section 1

Section 2

Bottom half

Section 3

Section 4

References

External links
 Tournament Link

Spain Masters
Spain Masters
Spain Masters
Sports competitions in Barcelona
Spain Masters